Danish Academy may refer to:

 Danish Academy, founded in 1960
 Royal Danish Academy of Music
 Royal Danish Academy of Sciences and Letters
 Royal Danish Academy of Fine Arts